Leszno  is a village in Warsaw West County, Masovian Voivodeship, in east-central Poland. It is the seat of the gmina (administrative district) called Gmina Leszno.

The village has a population of 3,500.

Polish professional footballer Robert Lewandowski grew up in Leszno. In 2016 he became an honorary citizen of Leszno.

History
The history of Leszno dates back to the Middle Ages. It was mentioned in documents in 1423. It was owned by various families, including the Łuszczewski family, which built a Baroque palace, which is the main landmark of the village.

Several men from Leszno died in various battles against the invading Russians during the Polish–Soviet War of 1919–1920. A memorial to those soldiers is located in the local Catholic Church of Saint John the Baptist.

During the invasion of Poland, which started World War II, in early September 1939, the Germans captured Leszno. On September 16, Poles recaptured the village for tactical purposes, while the Germans retreated in panic. On September 17, the Germans occupied Leszno again, and carried out a massacre of around 50 inhabitants in an act of revenge. Many men were transported to Błonie, from where they were to be deported to forced labor to Germany, but some managed to escape. About 70% of the village was burned down.

Sights
The main landmark of Leszno is the Baroque Łuszczewski Palace with an adjacent park. There are two historic churches, one Catholic and one Mariavite. In the village there is also a monument commemorating Polish soldiers, partisans and inhabitants killed during World War II.

Sports
The local football club is Partyzant Leszno. Robert Lewandowski took his first steps in football in the club. It competes in the lower leagues.

Gallery

References

Villages in Warsaw West County
Nazi war crimes in Poland